Lasantha Wickrematunge, a Sri Lankan journalist, politician and human rights activist, was fatally shot and assassinated in Colombo, Sri Lanka on January 8, 2009. It is believed that he was killed due to his work journalistic work critical of Sri Lankan politicians. His murder was widely condemned across the world. The Government of Sri Lanka also expressed shock at the killing, pledging to do everything in its power to catch his killers.

Background
Due to his work as an investigative journalist, Wickrematunge faced a number of threats and attacks leading up to his assassination. In 1995, masked assailants pulled Wickrematunge and his first wife, Raine, out of their car and attacked them with clubs. Raine later stated that death threats had become part of the routine of their lives: "There were so many threatening calls. 'We are going to kill you. We are going to kill your children.'" 
In 2002, Wickrematunge's then-wife left Sri Lanka due to the constant threats against their family, taking their three children to Australia.

On 5 September 2000 Lasantha Wickrematunge was found guilty of criminally defaming Sri Lankan President Chandrika Kumaratunga in a 1995 article in The Sunday Leader. Wickrematunge was sentenced to two years in jail, suspended for five years.

Wickrematunge was threatened by President Mahinda Rajapaksa with whom he had a close personal friendship with for over 20 years. Wickrematunge was allegedly abused in a profanity-laden telephone call on 11 January 2006. According to Wickrematunge the President had threatened to “destroy him” over a publication in his newspaper which discussed then First Lady Shiranthi Rajapaksa. Wickrematunge was briefly detained  at Bandaranaike International Airport on 21 February 2006 as he arrived for a flight to Geneva. Airport officials had claimed that Wickrematunge required "special permission" to leave Sri Lanka.

In late December 2006, an unsuccessful attempt was made to arrest Wickrematunge for "endangering national security" after he published a report exposing an Rs. 500 million luxury bunker to be built in the presidential complex. Criminal Investigation Department personnel had consulted Sri Lanka's then Attorney General, on the possibility of detaining Wickrematunge under Emergency Regulations.
Wickrematunge addressed the media and a large gathering of supporters outside the premises of The Sunday Leader and stated that he will not seek safe passage overseas and will face all political oppression levelled against him and “stand unbowed and unafraid”. Due to the public outcry and pressure on the Government by the country's Opposition Party and local and international Human Rights organisations, he was not arrested.

On 5 December 2008, a judge ordered Leader Publications not to publish any reports about Gotabaya Rajapaksa for two weeks.

Assassination

Wickrematunge was shot while he was on his way to work at around 10:30 a.m. on 8 January 2009, a few days before he was scheduled to give evidence about Gotabhaya Rajapaksa's corruption in arms deals before a judge. Four armed assassins riding motorcycles blocked Wickrematunge's vehicle before breaking open his window and shooting him. He was taken to the Colombo South Teaching Hospital. A helicopter was put on standby to transfer him to the Colombo National Hospital. A specialist team of 20 medical personnel were called in for the surgery. Despite the surgery lasting nearly three hours, Wickrematunge died from his head wounds.

Response

National
President Mahinda Rajapaksa described the assassination as an attempt to discredit the government, and said he was both grieved and shocked. He also said he had ordered a thorough police inquiry, and called the assassination an “international conspiracy”.
The Opposition Leader Ranil Wickremesinghe responded, calling the assassination part of an anti-democratic conspiracy, and accused the government of attempting to silence its critics.

The United National Party, Sri Lanka's main opposition party, also staged a demonstration in parliament on 9 January to protest his assassination.

International
Wickrematunge's assassination caused an international outcry. Reporters Without Borders
said that "Sri Lanka has lost one of its more talented, courageous and iconoclastic journalists," and that "President Mahinda Rajapaksa, his associates and the government media are directly to blame because they incited hatred against him and allowed an outrageous level of impunity to develop with regards to violence against the press". The assassination was condemned by Norway, the United States, the United Kingdom, the European Union, India and Japan, and the United Nations strongly condemned the assassination while the World Bank expressed its concerns over the attack.
The British Secretary of State for Foreign and Commonwealth Affairs, David Miliband, said in a statement that the British government condemned the killing of Wickrematunge and said that it was the duty of the authorities to take prompt action into these incidents: 

Lindsay Ross, former executive director, Commonwealth Press Union, London condemned the assassination and said in a statement,

In a statement ahead of World Press Freedom Day Ban Ki Moon called on the government of Sri Lanka to ensure that those responsible for Lasantha Wickrematunge's murder were found and prosecuted.

An editorial in Time magazine called his death "A personal loss to Time".

Wickrematunge's widow of 13 days, Sonali Samarasinghe Wickrematunge, fled the country a month after Wickrematunge's death and now calls herself an editor in exile.

Funeral

The funeral of Lasantha Wickrematunge was one of the largest public funerals held in Sri Lanka. Wickrematunge's funeral was open to the public.  Opposition leaders, human rights activists and diplomats demonstrated in protest of his killing.

Investigation
After denying all responsibility for the attack the Rajapaksa government called for an investigation. Despite intense media pressure, no one was arrested, and Sri Lankan media speculated that the murder investigation may "end up as a cover-up", and that safeguards for an independent media appeared bleak.

After Mahinda Rajapaksa's defeat at the presidential election in 2015, the new government of President Maithripala Sirisena reopened the investigation over allegations that former Defence Secretary Gotabhaya Rajapaksa ordered the assassination.

Ranil Wickremesinghe, the former Prime Minister, accused Sarath Fonseka, the former army commander, of the murder of Lasantha Wickrematunge in 2008 and 2009. In 2011, the former MP Rajiva Wijesinha told the BBC Sinhala Service that the British High Commission in Colombo had told him it possessed evidence that Fonseka was involved in the assassination of Wickremetunge. According to Fonseka, the order for the assassination was given by Gotabaya.

In October 2016, a retired intelligence officer committed suicide and left a note claiming he was the killer of Wickrematunge and that the intelligence officers that were arrested and under investigation were innocent. The intelligence officer's family reported to police that they did not believe the officer's death was a suicide.

See also
Lasantha Wickrematunge
The Sunday Leader
Gotabaya Rajapaksa

References

2009 in Sri Lanka
Deaths by firearm in Sri Lanka